Mustafa Karagöllü (born April 26, 1981) is a boxer from Turkey, who participated in the 2004 Summer Olympics.

Career
He reached fifth place at the 1999 Junior European Amateur Boxing Championships in Rijeka, Croatia and took part in the World Championships in 2001 and 2003, where he, however, in each case before reaching the medals eliminated against Dimitar Shtilianov.

At the 2004 European Amateur Boxing Championships in Pula, Croatia he won a bronze medal in the light welterweight. After victories against José Gutiérrez from Spain, Roman Kulichenko from Israel and Ionuţ Gheorghe from Romania, he only lost in the semifinals against Alexander Maletin of Russia.

He competed at the 2004 Summer Olympics in Athens, Greece, defeated in the first round the Indian Vijender Singh, then lost in the second round against Ionuţ Gheorghe. 

Between May 2005 and November 2008 has won 14 of his 15 professional boxing match . He was only lost against Domenico Spada in December 2006 in the match for the International Champion of the WBC middleweight.

References

External links
 

1981 births
Living people
Sportspeople from Ankara
Olympic boxers of Turkey
Boxers at the 2004 Summer Olympics
Light-welterweight boxers
Turkish male boxers
21st-century Turkish people